Copelatus teranishii is a species of diving beetle. It is part of the genus Copelatus in the subfamily Copelatinae of the family Dytiscidae. It was described by Kamiya in 1938.

References

teranishii
Beetles described in 1938